Science Hill School may refer to:

Science Hill School (Shelbyville, Kentucky), listed on the National Register of Historic Places in Shelby County, Kentucky
Science Hill School (Alliance, Ohio), listed on the National Register of Historic Places in Stark County, Ohio